Baron Scrope  may refer to:

Baron Scrope of Masham, an English barony title that became abeyant in 1517
Baron Scrope of Bolton, an English barony title that became dormant in 1630